Nurun may refer to:
Nurun, Kerman
Nurun, Zanjan